Barbari Roma Nord (barbarians in Italian) is an american football team from Rome, Italy. C

The team practices in the Ernesto Dezi sports center, and has won three national awards.

External links
Official Website
Federazione Italiana American Football FIDAF

American football teams in Italy
1999 establishments in Italy
American football teams established in 1999